Blind Man's Buff is an oil-on-canvas painting by Jean-Honoré Fragonard, produced ca. 1775–1780 after the artist's second journey to Italy in 1773–74. It is now in the Timken Museum of Art in San Diego, California.

Well-dressed men, women and children play the familiar game in a picturesque overgrown garden. Fragonard's favorite subject, he may have viewed the game as symbolizing the game of courtship. According to eighteenth-century engravings of the painting and another earlier version of the subject both may have originally been as much as a foot higher at the top.

References

1770s paintings
Paintings by Jean-Honoré Fragonard
Paintings in the collection of the Timken Museum of Art